"Power of a Woman" is a song by British R&B girl group Eternal. It was written by the songwriting duo of Carl Sturken and Evan Rogers, and was released as the first single from their second studio album, Power of a Woman. It was also the group's first release as a trio after the departure of Louise Redknapp. "Power of a Woman" peaked at number five on the UK Singles Chart and became the group's fifth top-10 single. In Australia, the song became the group's second top-10 single, reaching number eight in April 1996.

Critical reception
James Masterton for Dotmusic wrote that the new track "is less of an immediate pop hit that some of its predecessors, instead being a rather dark yet no less brilliant R&B track. That alone is enough to make it the biggest new hit of the week". Pan-European magazine Music & Media noted that the British trio "manages to sound both forceful and feminine at the same time. Their seductive voices blend in well with the contemporary R&B-influenced production." A reviewer from Music Week rated it five out of five and picked it as Single of the Week, calling it "a sinuous, piano-propelled R&B number, with US appeal stamped all over it." James Hamilton from the magazine's RM Dance Update described it as a "powerfully wailed and cooed excellent US-style jillswinger".

Music video
A music video was produced to promote the single, directed by Randee St. Nicholas.

Track listings

 UK and Australasian CD single 
 "Power of a Woman"
 "Hurry Up"
 "Power of a Woman" (Fathers of Sound dub mix)
 "Power of a Woman" (Bottom Dollar dub mix)

 UK cassette single and European CD single 
 "Power of a Woman"
 "Hurry Up"

 UK 12-inch single 
A1. "Power of a Woman" (Fathers of Sound vocal mix)
A2. "Power of a Woman" (Bottom Dollar vocal mix)
B1. "Power of a Woman" (Boot & Mac mix)
B2. "Power of a Woman" (D.A.R.C. R&B mix)

 Japanese mini-CD single 
 "Power of a Woman (パワー・オブ・ア・ウーマン)"
 "Who Are You (フー・アー・ユー)"

Credits and personnel
Credits are adapted from the Power of a Woman album booklet.

Studio
 Mastered at The Master Room (London, England)

Personnel

 Carl Sturken – writing
 Evan Rogers – writing
 Milton McDonald – guitar
 Dave Phillips – keyboards
 Ronnie Wilson – production
 Dennis Charles – production

 Nick Hopkins – recording engineer
 Andy Bradfield – mix engineer
 Ashley Alexander – assistant engineer
 Paul Meehan – programming
 Sam Noel – technician
 Arun Chakraverty – mastering

Charts

Weekly charts

Year-end charts

Certifications

References

1995 singles
1995 songs
EMI Records singles
Eternal (band) songs
First Avenue Records singles
Songs written by Carl Sturken and Evan Rogers
Music videos directed by Randee St. Nicholas